Geoffrey Strickland Cooper OBE (25 October 1925 – 13 December 2014) was a Royal Air Force officer of the post-Second World War era who as a fighter pilot saw action in the Middle East and Malaya.

In early 1948, Cooper was stationed at Ramat David in Palestine with 208 Squadron when his base came under attack from a Spitfire of the Egyptian Air Force, destroying two British Spitfires on the ground. Just hours later an Egyptian patrol of three more Spitfires attacked again. In the subsequent fight, Cooper shot down one Spitfire, damaged another which a colleague then shot down, and a third was destroyed from the ground.

In January 1949, while on patrol, Cooper was involved in a fight with Spitfires of the Israeli Air Force and forced to bail out inside Egyptian territory. He was found by Bedouin tribesmen and returned to his base.

In 1956, Cooper was involved in actions against communist insurgents in Malaya.

Cooper retired from the RAF in 1978 as an Air Commodore. He then worked as the air correspondent of the Daily Telegraph.

References

External links
https://web.archive.org/web/20180414141639/http://www.spyflight.co.uk/iafvraf.htm
http://www.rafweb.org/Biographies/Cooper_GS.htm
http://www.btnews.co.uk/article/8461

1925 births
2014 deaths
Royal Air Force air commodores
The Daily Telegraph people
People from Essex
People educated at Winchester College
Members of the Order of the British Empire
20th-century English businesspeople
Military personnel from Essex
20th-century Royal Air Force personnel